Lewis Pass (el. 907 m.) is a mountain pass in the South Island of New Zealand.

The northernmost of the three main passes across the Southern Alps, it is higher than the Haast Pass, and slightly lower than Arthur's Pass. State Highway 7 traverses the pass on its route between north Canterbury and the West Coast; it passes through extensive unmodified beech forest. The road officially opened on Saturday 30 October 1937 and had a regular bus route over it until Intercity's service was replaced by a seasonal shuttle.

The pass is the saddle between the valleys of the Maruia River to the northwest and the Lewis River to the southeast. The saddle is located close to the small spa of Maruia Springs.

The Lewis Pass is named after Henry Lewis who, together with Christopher Maling, was the first European to discover the pass, in April 1860 while working as a surveyor of the Nelson Provincial Survey Department. Before this time the pass was used by the Ngāi Tahu Māori of Canterbury to transport Pounamu (greenstone) from the west coast.

The area around Lewis Pass is protected as a national reserve. There are a number of tramping routes in the Lewis Pass area, including the St James Walkway.  The short Alpine Nature Walk loop walk around an alpine wetland and tarn can be accessed from a carpark near the saddle.

References

Mountain passes of New Zealand
Landforms of Canterbury, New Zealand
Buller District
Transport in Canterbury, New Zealand
Mountain passes of the Southern Alps